Options of a Trapped Mind is the debut album by Slovenian Thrash metal band Negligence. It was self-released on 11 June 2007, and later re-released through Rock It Up Records.

Background
The album features back then 16-year-old Alex on vocals. It was recorded, produced, mixed and mastered by the band throughout 2006. The group held no official tour to support the album but still played numerous concerts in Slovenia and the neighbouring countries, including the Thrash Assault 3 festival in Würzburg with Heathen, Sadus and Devastation. A video was released for the song Warmachine, which received a modest airplay on MTV.

Track listing

Personnel
Negligence
 Alex - lead vocals
 Jey - guitar
 Lipnik - bass guitar
 Ruzz - drums
 Dyz - guitar

Production
Produced, Engineered and mastered by Negligence, Mixed by Ruzz.

References

2007 debut albums
Negligence (band) albums